Limeux may refer to the following places in France:

Limeux, Cher, a commune in the department of Cher
Limeux, Somme, a commune in the department of Somme